Eisenhower is the fourth studio album and eighth album overall by American indie rock band The Slip.  It was released November 7, 2006 on Bar/None Records. It was produced by The Slip and Matthew Ellard (who has also produced for Elliott Smith and Billy Bragg and Wilco) and engineered by Drew Malamud (Stars, Metric). It represented a drastic departure for the Boston/Montreal band, going from their previous jazz-fused to sound to a more streamlined, indie rock sound. The album features contributions from Japanese singer Ua, as well as Chris Seligman from the Canadian indie band Stars. The song "Even Rats" was featured in the PlayStation 2 video game Guitar Hero. Live versions of "Children of December" and "If One of Us Should Fall" were previously released on Live at Lupo's 6/12/04, and another live version of the latter was on Alivelectric. "Children of December" and "Even Rats" were released for the Rock Band video game series through the Rock Band Network on March 4, 2010.

Track listing 
"Children of December" – 4:49
"Even Rats" – 5:33
"If One of Us Should Fall" – 5:26
"Airplane/Primitive" – 6:55
"Suffocation Keep" – 5:21
"First Panda in Space" – 2:20
"The Soft Machine" – 4:21
"Life in Disguise" – 3:45
"Mothwing Bite" – 3:29
"The Original Blue Air" – 2:24
"Paper Birds" – 8:19

Japanese bonus tracks
"Airplane/Primitive (feat. UA)"
"Airplane/Primitive (feat. UA)" *Radio Edit
"Lonely Boy"

Credits

The Slip
Andrew Barr – drums
Brad Barr – vocals, guitar
Marc Friedman – bass

Additional musicians
Gabri Athayde – Cello
Grayson Farmer – Flugelhorn
Nellie Fleischner – Vocals
Rosie Kirincic – Vocals
Chris Seligman – French Horn
Isaac Taylor – Vocals

Technical personnel
Matthew Ellard – Producer, Engineer, Mixing
John Frattalone – Management
Drew Malamud – Engineer, Mixing
Mister Thecake – Design, Layout Design
Perry Serpa – Publicity
The Slip – Producers
Kristen Smith – Assistant
Matt Tahaney – Assistant
Andy VanDette – Mastering

References

2006 albums
The Slip (band) albums
Bar/None Records albums